Anaren, Inc. provides high-frequency microwave microelectronics, components, and assemblies for wireless, aerospace, and defense electronics applications.

The company is headquartered in and operates five manufacturing facilities, each of which is subsidiary of Anaren, Inc. These include Anaren Microwave, Syracuse, New York; Anaren Ceramics, Salem, New Hampshire; MS Kennedy, Syracuse, New York; Unicircuit, Littleton, Colorado; and Anaren Communications, Suzhou, China.

History
Anaren was founded by Hugh A. Hair and Carl W. Gerst in 1967. Both were RF engineers who left General Electric to focus on a new company that would develop several new RF technologies, including the circuit-etching technologies called stripline manufacturing. The company started with a few dozen employees and a small facility in Syracuse, New York and its first customers were many manufacturing firms in the U.S. defense and aerospace sector including Hughes, Litton Industries (now part of Northrop Grumman), and Raytheon. Contracts and assignments secured during the company's early years included: a microwave landing system for jetliners funded by the United States Department of Defense under FAA supervision; "wideband microwave tracking receivers" for use in direction-finding systems; and the company's first DFD (digital frequency discriminators) and ESM (electronic support measures) to help fighter jets and seaborne vessels detect, identify, and elude the radar signals of hostile craft.

The company originally built custom solutions, many of which later became commercial products. In contrast to the smaller volumes of the custom products, these commercial products were marketed by the company on a larger, high-volume scale. The Cold War arms race drove the bulk of business over the company's first decade. By 1981, the company had grown to around 200 employees, achieved sales over $8,000,000, and required more space, which led to the construction of its current headquarters campus in East Syracuse, New York.

With the decline of Cold War spending in the mid-1990s, the company diversified from the defense market by entering the commercial wireless infrastructure market with its Xinger-brand surface mount (SMT) component family, which included hybrid couplers, directional couplers, and power dividers. Shortly thereafter, the company established two operating groups: a Space & Defense Group focused on the company's traditional military and aerospace customers, and a Wireless Group focused on wireless infrastructure customers including operators of Cellular networks.

Although the company's Wireless Group was created to meet the needs of the wireless base-station market, later generations of passive components have become small enough to be used in mobile electronics. The newer subminiature Xinger line of passive components are used in consumer devices such as cell phones, PDAs, wireless laptops, WLANS, Bluetooth applications, and set-top boxes.

The Space and Defense group remains a significant part of Anaren's business. In August 2012, Anaren's Space & Defense Group received contracts in excess of $11.5 million for passive ranging subsystems for airborne applications.

Anaren was acquired by the privately held company Veritas Capital in February 2014 and delisted from the NASDAQ.

Technologies

Wireless Group Technologies
Anaren manufactures high-volume standard components for commercial wireless infrastructure and consumer electronics OEMs.

The surface mount components include couplers, power dividers, and balun transformers. They are used in both base station equipment and Consumer electronics products including mobile phones, Bluetooth headsets, set-top boxes, and laptop computers.

Resistive components include terminations, resistors, and attenuators. They are used in wireless, military, instrumentation, and aerospace applications.

The Anaren Integrated Radio (AIR) modules incorporate RF Transceivers from Texas Instruments and Broadcom. These modules typically incorporate a transceiver IC, matching circuit, and antenna, for adding Bluetooth low energy, Zigbee, or proprietary RF links to a system. Applications for wireless modules include Wireless sensor networks, Smart grid, and Real-time locating system.

In 2014, Anaren acquired Cellular Machines, an IoT company specializing in monitoring temperature data of refrigeration equipment.

Space & Defense Group Technologies
Anaren's Space & Defense Group is a subcontractor to several military and aerospace companies, including Raytheon, Lockheed Martin, Northrop Grumman, BAE, and Thales. They manufacture RF components for use in threat detection, communications, navigation, and other functions in ground, sea, space, and aircraft applications. Anaren's standard and custom RF solutions include: 
 Printed circuit board and ceramic based RF assemblies are used by defense and aerospace OEMs and subcontractors 
 integrated microwave assemblies
 multi-chip RF modules
 Active Electronically Scanned Arrays
 broadband receivers for missile applications
 RF and LO distribution for complex receivers
 Beamformers for satellite communications antennae
 switch matrices for redundancy and signal routing
 antenna feed networks for surface, airborne, and space radars
 digital RF memories and frequency discriminators
 RF integrated backplanes

References

DeWitt, New York
Electronics companies established in 1967
Privately held companies based in New York (state)
Wireless sensor network
1967 establishments in New York (state)